Bang's may refer to:

 Bang's bacillus, Brucella abortus, a bacterium that causes abortion in hoofed animals and undulant fever in humans
 Brucellosis, also known as Bang's disease and undulant fever
 Bang's Falls, Nova Scotia, a community in Canada
 Bangs's Mountain Squirrel, a species of tree squirrel
 Go-Bang's, a Japanese girl band of the 1980s and 1990s
 Bang's theorem (disambiguation)

See also
 Bang (disambiguation)
 Bang Bang (disambiguation)